The Cappy Barra Harmonica Band was an American harmonica ensemble — originally a trio, then a quartet, then two groups  — that played big band arrangements. Cappy Barra flourished from 1935 to 1945.

History 
1938 to 1942

 Cappy Barra was assembled by promoter Maurice Duke. The name was derived from "capybara," the largest extant rodent in the world, native to South America. In 1940, Sam Scheckter and Sam Sperling left the group, George Fields replaced Schekter. Shortly after, the act split into two groups. The first unit worked primarily in the Chicago area.  A second unit, based in New York, formed around Phil King, who enlisted newcomers George Fields, Charley Leighton, Alan Greene and Pro Robbins (né Irving Rubenstein).

 The Chicago unit, a trio, disbanded in 1942 when Nat Bergman and Cappy LaFell enlisted in the Armed Forces. Don Ripps returned to Freeport, Texas.

 The New York unit worked steadily in vaudeville and in nightclubs through the war years. George Fields left in 1941 to move to California, and the group played as a trio, with Charles Leighton handling the lead, Alan Greene playing chord harp and singing, and Pro Robbins on bass harp.  Phil King booked the band, played an occasional Polyphonia, did comedy bits, and fronted the group. The group disbanded in 1944.

Post World War II

 Around 1945, Duke reorganized Cappy Barra as a quartet and moved it to Los Angeles with the aim of getting Hollywood studio work.  The performers were Charley Leighton on lead, George Fields on second, Pete Petersen on third, and Pro Robbins on fourth.

Performing members
 Cappy LaFell (né Leon S. Lehrfeld; 1913–2002)
 Joe Mullendore (aka  Raymond Joe Sanns, né Joseph Milton Mullendore Jr.; 1914–1990)
 Nat Bergman (aka Nate Burton, né Nathaniel Bergman; 1916–1994)
 Phil Solomon
 Don Ripps (1918–1965)
 Samuel Scheckter (1913–1995)
 Sam Sperling
 George Joseph Fields (1921–2005)
 Charley Leighton (1921–2009)
 Alan Greene
 Pro Robbins (né Irving Rubenstein)
 Pete Petersen
 Milton Freeman
 Eddie Shu (né Edward Shulman; 1918–1986)

Non-performing members
 Maurice Duke (1910–1996).
 Phil King, served as spokesman and leader, but not a musician
 Harry Morton (1912–2004), comedian
 Henry Nemo (1909–1999), composer & arranger

Filmography 
 Musical Airwaves (1936, a 10-minute short), Milton Edward Schwarzwald (1891–1950), director, Universal Pictures
 Mad About Music (1938), Universal Pictures
 I Love to Whistle, by Jimmy McHugh & Harold Adamson (lyrics) (1938), sung by Deanna Durbin with the Cappy Barra Harmonica Band at party (audio clip)
 Pot o' Gold (1941) (video clip; Cappy Barra is dubbed) 
 Rockin' in the Rockies (1945) (video clip)
 Radio Stars on Parade (1945) (video clip)
 Bowery Boy (1945)
Musical film shorts

The 1942–44 musicians' strike banned musicians from recording with major labels. A year earlier (1941), the motion picture industry began producing short music films, which were not banned.  The films were the early version of music videos — known as "soundies.  Cappy Barra performed on the following soundies:
The Smoothies (vocal group) and The Cappy Barra Harmonica Boys
Smoothies personnel:  Babs (Blanche Redwine?) and the two brothers, Charlie & Little Ryan (né Reinhart)

Discography 
Cappy Barra Harmonica Swing Ensemble
 Recorded April 5, 1937, Variety Recordings (600)
 M359 Voo Doo 
 M356 Stardust, by Hoagy Carmichael 
 78 rpm, 10-inch (1937) 
 Casa Loma Stomp, by Gene Gifford 
 Solitude, by Duke Ellington, arranged by Gene Gifford

Sheet music 
 Nocturne in Blue, by Al Greene (lyrics) & Raymond Joe Sanns (né Joseph Milton Mullendore Jr.; 1914–1990) (music), © February 11, 1941; 249699 (Joseph Milton Mullendore Jr., Philadelphia)
 Voo Doo, by Raymond Joe Sanns (né Joseph Milton Mullendore Jr.; 1914–1990), Leon Lafell (né Leon S. Lehrfeld; 1913–2002), and Maurice Duke (1910–1996), © June 10, 1937; 62625 (Exclusive Publications, Inc., New York)
 It's Nature All Around Me, by Joseph Milton Mullendore Jr. (1914–1990), © January 18, 1934; 81496 (Leon Lafell; né Leon S. Lehrfeld; 1913–2002)

See also 
 The Harmonica Gentlemen
 List of harmonicists

Other harmonica ensembles 
United States
 The Harmonica Gentlemen
 The Harmonica Rascals
 The Harmonica Scamps
 The Harmonicuties
 The Harmonica Harlequins
 The Philharmonicas
 The Harlemonicats
 The Three Harpers (see Stan Harper)
 The Harptones
 The Stagg McMann Trio
 The Harmonica Hi-Hats
 The Harmonica Lads
 The Don Henry Trio
 The Harmonica Gang
 The Stereomonics
 The Big Harp
Netherlands
 The 5 Hotchas
 Eddie Sernee, Joop Heijman, Geert van Driesten, Cor Belder, Wim Belder
Ireland
 The Bachelors
France
 Trio Raisner
Hong Kong
 King's College Harmonica Band

References 
General references

Inline citations

American instrumental musical groups
Harmonica players